Uzunoba is a village and municipality in the Khachmaz Rayon of Azerbaijan.  It has a population of 1,260.  The municipality consists of the villages of Uzunoba, Baraxum, Xəzərli, and Şərifoba.

References 

Populated places in Khachmaz District